Nowe Wymyśle  is a village in the administrative district of Gmina Gąbin, within Płock County, Masovian Voivodeship, in east-central Poland.

The village has a population of 183.

History
The town was once known as "Deutsch Wymyschle" and was predominantly Mennonite. Deutsch Wymyschle was adjacent to the town of Gąbin, half of the population of which was Jewish. Following the Nazi invasion of Poland on September 1, 1939, the Nazis rounded up the Jews of Gąbin and confiscated their property. Eager to profit from the ethnic cleansing of the Jewish population and wanting to comply with Nazi policies of Germanization, the Mennonites of Deutsch Wymyschle claimed the formerly Jewish homes and businesses as their own. Mennonite women often solidified their loyalty to the Nazis by marrying soldiers of the German Wehrmacht, with many weddings being performed in the Mennonite church of Deutsch Wymyschle involving couples dressed in Nazi uniforms. Erich L. Ratzlaff, a prominent Mennonite Nazi who became Mayor of Gąbin, was known to carry a whip in order to terrorize Jews. Ratzlaff later immigrated to Canada and became an editor of the Mennonitische Rundschau newspaper from 1967 to 1979.

Notable residents
Erich L. Ratzlaff, a Mennonite Nazi.

References

Anabaptist–Jewish relations
Jewish Polish history
Mennonitism in Poland
Villages in Płock County